Great Big Sea was a Canadian folk rock band. Their discography comprises nine studio albums, three compilation albums, three live albums and twenty-eight singles.

Studio albums

Compilations

Live albums

Singles

1990s

2000s

2010s

DVD

Other releases 
2005: Podcasts
2006: Podcasts
2007: Podcasts

References

External Links
 

Discographies of Canadian artists
Rock music group discographies